Stephen Noteboom and Fernon Wibier were the defending champions, but lost in the first round to Alex O'Brien and Richey Reneberg.

Richard Krajicek and Jan Siemerink won the title by defeating Hendrik Jan Davids and Andrei Olhovskiy 7–5, 6–3 in the final.

Seeds

Draw

Draw

References

External links
 Official results archive (ATP)
 Official results archive (ITF)

Rosmalen Grass Court Championships
1995 ATP Tour